= Royal Scot Motel =

General information
- Location: 20904 Stony Plain Rd, Edmonton, Alberta, Canada

Other information
- Number of suites: 27

Royal Scot Motel is a motel and RV park on Stony Plain Road in Edmonton, Alberta.

== Description ==
The 27-suite motel is owned by Alkarim and Diallah Bhanji.

== Fine ==
In September 2014 a $140,000 fine, one of the largest in Alberta's history, was levied against the Royal Scot Motel for ignoring 41 health code violations for 3 years including exposed wires, missing smoke detectors and raw sewage.
